The men's 25 km points race competition at the 2006 Asian Games was held on the 12th and 13 December at the Aspire Hall 1.

Schedule
All times are Arabia Standard Time (UTC+03:00)

Results
Legend
DNF — Did not finish

Qualifying

Heat 1

Heat 2

Final

References 

Cycling Track Results

External links 
Official website

Track Men points race